The Museo del Novecento ("museum of the twentieth century") is a museum of twentieth-century art in Milan, in Lombardy in northern Italy. It is housed in the Palazzo dell'Arengario, near Piazza del Duomo in the centre of the city.

The museum opened in December 2010. It displays about 400 works, most of them Italian, from the twentieth century.

Collection

Apart from a single room housing works by foreign artists including Braque, Kandinsky, Klee, Léger, Matisse, Mondrian and Picasso, the majority of the works exhibited in the museum are by Italian artists. A major section is devoted to the Italian Futurists, with works by Giacomo Balla, Umberto Boccioni, Carlo Carrà, Fortunato Depero, Luigi Russolo, Gino Severini, Mario Sironi and Ardengo Soffici. Giuseppe Pellizza da Volpedo's large canvas Il Quarto Stato (1902) is also exhibited in a room on its own.

Other sections of the museum are dedicated to individual artists such as Giorgio de Chirico, Lucio Fontana and Morandi. There are also sections devoted to art movements of the twentieth century, including Abstractionism, Arte Povera, the Novecento Italiano, Post-Impressionism and Realism, and to genres such as landscape and monumental art.

In 2015 the museum received a large donation from private collectors Bianca and Mario Bertolini of contemporary art works by artists such as Daniel Buren, Joseph Kosuth, Roy Lichtenstein, Robert Rauschenberg, Frank Stella and Andy Warhol.

Facilities

The museum has a bookshop, and a restaurant-bar on the top floor, overlooking Piazza del Duomo.

References

Further reading
Museo del Novecento: The collection, 2010, aavv. (Italian language edition)

Art museums and galleries in Milan
Modern art museums in Italy
Art museums established in 2010
2010 establishments in Italy
Contemporary art galleries in Italy
Tourist attractions in Milan